Édouard Fitting (15 August 1898 – 7 July 1945) was a Swiss épée and foil fencer. He competed at four Olympic Games.

References

External links
 

1898 births
1945 deaths
Swiss male épée fencers
Olympic fencers of Switzerland
Fencers at the 1920 Summer Olympics
Fencers at the 1924 Summer Olympics
Fencers at the 1928 Summer Olympics
Fencers at the 1936 Summer Olympics
Sportspeople from Lausanne
Swiss male foil fencers